

Belgium
 Belgian Congo – Théophile Wahis, Governor-General of the Belgian Congo (1908–1912)

France
 French Somaliland – Pierre Hubert Auguste Pascal, Governor of French Somaliland (1909–1911)
 Guinea – 
 Victor Théophile Liotard, Lieutenant-Governor of Guinea (1908–1910)
 Georges Poulet, acting Lieutenant-Governor of Guinea (1910)
 Camille Guy, Lieutenant-Governor of Guinea (1910–1912)

Japan
 Karafuto – Hiraoka Teitarō, Governor-General of Karafuto (12 June 1908 – 5 June 1914)
 Korea – 
Terauchi Masatake, Resident-General (1909–1910)
Terauchi Masatake, Governor-General of Korea (1910–1916)
 Taiwan – Sakuma Samata, Governor-General of Taiwan (15 April 1906 – May 1915)

Portugal
 Angola – 
 José Augusto Alves Roçadas, Governor-General of Angola (1909–1910)
 Caetano Francisco Cláudio Eugénio Gonçalves, Governor-General of Angola (1910–1911)

United Kingdom
 Barotziland-North-Western Rhodesia – Lawrence Aubrey Wallace, Administrator of Barotziland-North-Western Rhodesia (1909–1911)
 Malta Colony – Leslie Rundle, Governor of Malta (1909–1915)
 North-Eastern Rhodesia – Leicester Paul Beaufort, Administrator of North-Eastern Rhodesia (1909–1911)
 Straits Settlement – John Anderson, Governor of the Staits Settlement (1904–1911)

United States
 Hawaii - Walter F. Frear (1907–1913), Territorial Governor of Hawaii

Colonial governors
Colonial governors
1910